Conner Duthie (born 2 February 1997) is a Scottish footballer, who last played as a midfielder or striker for Scottish League One side Clyde. He has previously played for Hibernian, Dunfermline Athletic, Spartans, Stenhousemuir, Forfar Athletic and Dumbarton.

Club career
Signed from Hearts, Duthie made one appearance for Hibernian in the 2014–15 season against Dumbarton. On 28 August 2015, Duthie was loaned to Spartans, however in January 2016 he was released by his parent club. After his release, Duthie started a trial period with Scottish League One side Dunfermline Athletic. He played in a number of Development League games, including a match against his former side Hibernian, where he scored the only goal of the game, giving the Pars youth side only their second victory in 12 matches. At the end of March 2016, he signed permanently with the East End Park side.

On 31 January 2017, Duthie moved on a development loan to Scottish League One side Stenhousemuir until the end of the 2016–17 season, and at the end of October 2017, he joined Forfar Athletic on a short-term loan deal until January 2018. Duthie was released by Dunfermline in May 2018, having made just 7 first-team appearances in two years.

Duthie signed for Stenhousemuir in June 2018, and he left the club at the end of the 2018–19 season. Duthie tested positive for having taken cannabis in a drug test taken after a League One match against Stranraer on 16 March 2019. He was subsequently banned from all competitive sport for two years. After completing his ban, Duthie joined Scottish League One side Dumbarton in March 2021 scoring his first goal for the club against former side Forfar Athletic in April 2021. He extended his deal with the Sons at the end of the campaign, having impressed new manager Stephen Farrell and was named the club's Player of the Year in April 2022. He left the club in May 2022 following their relegation to Scottish League Two.

On 12 May 2022, Duthie signed a one-year deal with Clyde.

Career statistics

References

External links

1997 births
Living people
Footballers from Edinburgh
Scottish footballers
Association football forwards
Hibernian F.C. players
Spartans F.C. players
Dunfermline Athletic F.C. players
Stenhousemuir F.C. players
Forfar Athletic F.C. players
Scottish Professional Football League players
Lowland Football League players
Dumbarton F.C. players
Clyde F.C. players